Éramos Seis (English: Once We Were Six) is a Brazilian telenovela produced and broadcast by TV Globo. It premiered on 30 September 2019, replacing Órfãos da Terra, and ended on 27 March 2020. It is based on the book of the same name written by Maria José Dupré. The series is adapted by Ângela Chaves, with the collaboration of Bernardo Guilherme, Daisy Chaves and Juliana Peres.

It stars Glória Pires, Nicolas Prattes, Danilo Mesquita, Giullia Buscacio, André Luiz Frambach, Simone Spoladore, Ricardo Pereira and Cássio Gabus Mendes in the main roles.

Plot 
The story tells the life of a middle-class family from São Paulo between the 1920s and 1940s. Lola (Glória Pires) is a kind woman dedicated to her family, is married to Júlio (Antonio Calloni), who aspires to be rich and was indebted to finance a house on Avenida Angélica, in São Paulo; they have four children together. The studious Carlos (Danilo Mesquita) is the pride of the family, but has a troubled romance with Inês (Carol Macedo), whose mother is against the relationship. Alfredo (Nicolas Prattes) lives in conflict with his parents for his rebellious and riotous way, in addition to hating his older brother out of jealousy. The spoiled Isabel (Giullia Buscacio) shocks everyone when she gets involved with Felício (Paulo Rocha), a much older man. Julinho (André Luiz Frambach) dates Lili (Triz Pariz), but aims to rise socially, seeing this opportunity in the romance with Soraia (Rayssa Bratillieri), daughter of the rich Assad (Werner Schünemann), his father's boss. After her husband's premature death, Lola starts selling homemade sweets to support her family.

Lola's paternal aunt, Emília (Susana Vieira), is a bitter and millionaire widow who has never helped her family and lives taking care of her daughter, Justina (Julia Stockler), who has mental problems and cannot leave the house for this reason. Emilia sent her younger daughter, Adelaide (Joana de Verona), to Switzerland as a child, but she returns as an adult and conflicts with her mother over feminist ideas and the insistence that her sister should not be deprived of social life, in addition to being sexually open-minded and gets involved with her cousin Alfredo. The rest of Lola's family lives in Itapetininga: her mother Maria (Denise Weinberg), maternal aunt Candoca (Camila Amado) and sisters Clotilde (Simone Spoladore) and Olga (Maria Eduarda de Carvalho). Clotilde lives unhappily away from Almeida (Ricardo Pereira), with whom she broke up after discovering that he was divorced, for fear of judgment, although she hopes to take the courage to live love. Olga dreamed of becoming a member of high society, but she decided to marry her great love, Zeca (Eduardo Sterblitch), even though he is a humble pharmacist, articulating for her aunt Emília to hire him to take care of her business, thus being well paid and giving herself a good life.

Shirley (Barbara Reis) has always believed that she was abandoned while pregnant in her teens by João Aranha (Caco Ciocler), unaware that everything was a plan by his mother, and when she reunites with him more than ten years later, she discovers the truth. However, she is already married to Afonso (Cássio Gabus Mendes), who cares for their daughter, Inês, causing her to be torn between the love of the two, since Aranha starts to show himself as a possessive and different man from youth. Lola's best friend is the gossip Genu (Kelzy Ecard), married to the submissive Virgulino (Kiko Mascarenhas), with whom she has two children: Lili and Lúcio (Jhona Burjack), in love with Isabel.

Cast 
 Glória Pires as Eleonora "Lola" Amaral de Lemos
 Danilo Mesquita as Carlos Abílio de Lemos
 Nicolas Prattes as Alfredo Abílio de Lemos
 Giullia Buscacio as Isabel Abílio de Lemos
 André Luiz Frambach as Júlio "Julinho" Abílio de Lemos Filho
 Cássio Gabus Mendes as Afonso dos Santos Oliveira
 Simone Spoladore as Clotilde Amaral
 Ricardo Pereira as Argemiro de Almeida
 Joana de Verona as Adelaide Amaral Sampaio 
 Carol Macedo as Inês Ferreira dos Santos
 Paulo Rocha as Felício de Souza
 Rayssa Bratillieri as Soraia Assad
 Susana Vieira as Emília Amaral Sampaio 
 Maria Eduarda de Carvalho as Olga Amaral Marcondes de Bueno
 Eduardo Sterblitch as José Carlos "Zeca" Marcondes de Bueno
 Julia Stockler as Justina Amaral Sampaio
 Bárbara Reis as Shirley Ferreira
 Nicola Siri as Osório Tavares
 Marcela Jacobina as Natália Tellman
 Triz Pariz as Maria Lídia "Lili" Coutinho
 Jhona Burjack as Lúcio Coutinho
 Kelzy Ecard as Genuína "Genu" Coutinho
 Kiko Mascarenhas as Virgulino Coutinho
 Werner Schünemann as Jorge Assad
 Mayana Neiva as Karine Fagundes Assad
 Virgínia Rosa as Durvalina "Durva" da Silva
 Camila Amado as Cândida Amaral "Tia Candoca"
 Denise Weinberg as Maria Amaral
 Stepan Nercessian as Delegado Gusmões
 Brenno Leone as Elias Al-Fashi
 Izak Dahora as Sebastião "Tião"
 Guilherme Ferraz as Marcelo Gomes de Souza e Silva
 Thiago Justino as Higino
 Nilson Nunes as Alaor
 Caroline Verban as Hermengarda / Nely
 Duda Batista as Emily Amaral Marcondes de Bueno
 Marjorie Queiroz as Emiliana Amaral Marcondes de Bueno
 André Cidade as Otávio "Tavinho" Amaral Marcondes de Bueno
 Noha Hamdan as Rita Almeida
 João Vitor Manhães as Ernesto Almeida

Guest cast 
 Antônio Calloni as Júlio Abílio de Lemos
 Caco Ciocler as João Aranha
 Luciana Braga as Zulmira de Souza
 Irene Ravache as Tereza
 Nicette Bruno as Madre Joana
 Marcos Caruso as Prefeito Moysés
 Wagner Santisteban as Marcos
 Walderez de Barros as Marlene de Lemos
 Othon Bastos as Padre Venâncio
 Emiliano Queiroz as Seu Isidoro
 Lavínia Pannunzio as Lucy Assad
 Ellen Rocche as Marion
 Daniel Boaventura as Adoniran
 Aline Borges as Drª. Selma Telles
 Giselle Batista as Antonieta Piedade
 Cláudia Ventura as Profª. Benedita
 Roberto Frota as Dr. Vicente
 Joelson Medeiros as Ismael
 Luca de Castro as Dr. Evaristo
 Gillray Coutinho as Sinval
 Camilo Bevilacqua as Simão
 Paulo Carvalho as Mr. Hilton
 Eunice Bráulio as Carola
 Carla Nunes as Mabel Chagas
 Isaac Bernat as Josias Chagas
 Breno Nina as Ricardo Neves
 Beatriz Campos as Leontina Neves
 Raphaela Moraes as Rosaura Almeida
 Simon Petracchi as Hamilton Sampaio
 Nicola Lama as Conde de Franco
 Milton Walley as Calux
 Lucas Domso as Roberto
 Ademir de Souza as Palhaço Sorriso
 Werles Pajero as Sílvio
 Tiago Homci as Dráusio
 Pia Manfroni as Esmeralda
 Maria Mônica Passos as Dona Iracema
 Andrea Bacellar as Madame Bulhões
 Henrique Taxman as Dr. Rubens
 Gustavo Trestini as Tinoco
 Edvard Vasconcelos as Juiz Everaldo
 Bernardo Dugin as Nero
 Silvio Mattos as Sr. Flores
 Marcos Dioli as Clóvis
 Lucas Miranda as Laércio
 Rodrigo Ferrarini as Capitão Alves
 Roberto Lobo as Cassimiro
 Antônio Alves as Sr. Barbosa
 Karla Muniz as Madame Bulcão
 Nísia Rocha as Nena
 Bárbara Vento as Dita
 Gabriela Catai as Greta
 Giovanna Sanches as Doralice
 Luciano Pullig as Matias
 Gabriel Borges as Euclides
 Maitê Motta as Paulete
 Caio Antunes as León Ferreira Coutinho de Lemos
 Lara Gutterres as Cecília Souza Abílio de Lemos
 Clara Tiezzi as Adult Emiliana
 Karize Brum as Adult Emily
 Renan Ribeiro as Adult Tavinho
 Xande Valois as Child Carlos
 Pedro Sol Victorino as Child Alfredo
 Maju Lima as Child Isabel
 Davi de Oliveira as Child Julinho
 Gabriella Saraivah as Child Inês
 Melissa Nóbrega as Child Soraia
 Bruna Negendank as Child Lili
 Arthur Gama as Child Lúcio
 Lipinho Costa as Child Tião

Soundtrack

Volume 1 

Éramos Seis Vol. 1 is the first soundtrack of the telenovela, released on 6 December 2019 by Som Livre.

Volume 2 

Éramos Seis Vol. 2 is the second soundtrack of the telenovela, released on 24 January 2020 by Som Livre.

Ratings

References

External links 
 

2019 telenovelas
TV Globo telenovelas
Brazilian telenovelas
2019 Brazilian television series debuts
2020 Brazilian television series endings
Television shows set in São Paulo
Portuguese-language telenovelas